Cristina Gey Rondón (born 13 December 1998) is a Spanish footballer who plays as a forward for Sporting de Huelva.

Club career
Gey started her career at Punta del Caimán. She was promoted from the academy to the first team for Sporting de Huelva in July 2020.

References

External links
Profile at La Liga

1998 births
Living people
Women's association football forwards
Spanish women's footballers
Sportspeople from the Province of Huelva
Footballers from Andalusia
Sporting de Huelva players
Primera División (women) players
21st-century Spanish women